Crystal Jordan is a romance novelist who is published by Kensington Books, Samhain Publishing, Harlequin Spice Briefs, and Ellora's Cave. She has been a finalist in the National Readers' Choice Award (in 2010, 2011, and 2012), the Holt Medallion in 2011, the FF&P Prism Contest in 2009 and 2012, and the Booksellers Best Award in 2012. She won the 2009 Passionate Plume Award in Paranormal/Time Travel, and was a finalist in the contest in 2010 and 2011.

She is a member of the Romance Writers of America and began writing paranormal romance, contemporary romance, futuristic romance, erotic romance, and erotica after she finished graduate school in 2005. Born and raised in California, she lived and worked all over the United States before returning to her home state and assuming a position as a librarian at a university in the San Francisco Bay Area.

She has also been featured as part of The Popular Romance Project documentary.

Published works

Kensington Aphrodisia 
 "In Ice" in Sexy Beast V September 2008
 Carnal Desires December 2008
 On The Prowl May 2009
 "Naughty or Nice" in Under the Covers September 2009
 Untamed November 2009
 "Between Lovers" in Sexy Beast 9 September 2010
 Primal Heat October 2010
 Embrace the Night May 2011
 Prowl the Night September 2011
 "Taken Between" in Nightshift November 2011
 Night Games February 2012
 Unleashed September 2012

Cobblestone Press 
 Full Swing August 2006

The Wild Rose Press 
 All She Wants For Christmas December 2006
 A Lesson in Pleasure February 2007
 All She Needs September 2007

Ellora's Cave 
 Black Opals October 2008
 All Revved Up November 2011

Samhain Publishing 
 Treasured April 2008
 The Wanderer May 2010 (part of The Wasteland continuity series)
 Wasteland print omnibus April 2011 (part of The Wasteland continuity series)
 Demon's Caress January 2012

In the Heat of the Night Series
Total Eclipse of the Heart October 2008
Big Girls Don't Die January 2009
It's Raining Men May 2009
Crazy Little Thing Called Love July 2009
In the Heat of the Night print omnibus June 2010

Unbelievable Series
If You Believe September 2009
Believe In Me February 2010
Make Me Believe July 2011

Forbidden Passions Series
Co-written series with Loribelle Hunt
Stolen Passions November 2010
Passions Recalled December 2010, by Loribelle Hunt
Fleeting Passions February 2011
Passions March 2011, by Loribelle Hunt
Forbidden Passions print omnibus May 2012

Harlequin Spice Briefs 
 Wild March 2009
 Wanton August 2011
 Wicked April 2012

References

External links 
 Official Author Website
 Crystal Jordan's Blog

Living people
American romantic fiction writers
Year of birth missing (living people)